Diplomitoporus is a genus of fungi in the family Polyporaceae. The Dictionary of the Fungi (10th edition, 2008) estimated the widespread genus to contain 11 species; since then, the genus has grown with the additional of several newly described species, and some transfers from other genera. Diplomitoporus has been described as a wastebasket taxon, containing "species that share common macroscopic and microscopic characteristics, but are not necessarily related."

Diplomitoporus was circumscribed in 1970 by Polish mycologist Stanislaw Domanski, with Diplomitoporus flavescens as the type species. This species was originally described as a member of Trametes by Giacomo Bresadola in 1903.

Species
, Index Fungorum accepts 21 species of Diplomitoporus:

Diplomitoporus allantosporus Ryvarden & Iturr. (2003) – Venezuela
Diplomitoporus costaricensis I.Lindblad & Ryvarden (1999) – Costa Rica
Diplomitoporus crustulinus (Bres.) Domanski (1970) – Europe; North America
Diplomitoporus cunninghamii P.K.Buchanan & Ryvarden (1998) – New Zealand
Diplomitoporus daedaleiformis (Henn.) Ryvarden (2014)
Diplomitoporus flavescens (Bres.) Domanski (1970) – Europe
Diplomitoporus globisporus Ryvarden (2013) – Brazil
Diplomitoporus hondurensis (Murrill) Ryvarden (2000) – Belize
Diplomitoporus incisus Ryvarden (2000) – Puerto Rico
Diplomitoporus insularis Ryvarden (2009) – Seychelles
Diplomitoporus intermedius Baltazar & Ryvarden (2013) – Brazil
Diplomitoporus marianoi-rochae G.Coelho (2008)
Diplomitoporus meridionalis M.Pieri & B.Rivoire (1998)
Diplomitoporus microsporus Iturr. & Ryvarden (2010)
Diplomitoporus navisporus Gibertoni & Ryvarden (2004) – Brazil
Diplomitoporus overholtsii (Pilát) Gilb. & Ryvarden (1985) – Uganda
Diplomitoporus stramineus Ryvarden & Iturr. (2003) – Venezuela
Diplomitoporus sulphureus (Petch) Ryvarden (2015)
Diplomitoporus taquarae G.Coelho (2008)
Diplomitoporus venezuelicus Ryvarden & Iturr. (2003) – Venezuela

References

Polyporaceae
Polyporales genera
Fungi described in 1970